Harlequin (in the USA The Archer's Tale) is the first novel in The Grail Quest series by English author Bernard Cornwell, first published in 2000. The story takes place in the mid-14th century, during the Hundred Years' War.

Plot introduction
The narrative tells how Thomas of Hookton leaves his native Dorset to fight against the French in Brittany and, afterwards, at the battle of Crécy in Picardy. It is a tale of longbows and butchery, especially when England's archers swarm into the Norman city of Caen. And over it all, like a dream, hovers the Grail which is the epitome of chivalry and Christian decency, qualities which are in desperately short supply as the armies of France and England struggle at the beginning of what will be known as the Hundred Years War.

Plot summary
Prologue
Thomas grows up in the village of Hookton. The village priest, Father Ralph, is his father. Thomas has been training secretly with a bow, despite the fact that his father forbids it. On Easter morning, 1343, Norman raiders arrive under the command of Sir Guillaume d'Evecque, a French knight. A man dressed all in black who calls himself the Harlequin has hired Sir Guillaume to carry out the raid to steal Hookton's treasure, a lance that Thomas's father claims is the one used by Saint George to slay a dragon. The Harlequin mortally stabs Thomas's father; Thomas learns from his dying father that he is a French count who fled his evil family and that the Harlequin is Thomas's cousin. Thomas kills four of the raiders, but is powerless to stop the Harlequin and Sir Guillaume from leaving with the lance and various captives.

Brittany
Three years pass. Thomas has gone to France to serve in the English army and seek vengeance on his father's killers. He serves under a successful mercenary commander, Will Skeat. The army is besieging the small city of La Roche-Derrien. However, a half dozen assaults have been beaten back with many losses. Among the city defenders is a beautiful woman the besiegers call the Blackbird, who fights with a crossbow. She is Jeanette, the widowed Countess of Armorica. She wounds an impoverished, ambitious English knight, Sir Simon Jekyll, in the arm after one assault, and Jekyll vows revenge.

Skeat persuades the army commander, William Bohun, Earl of Northampton, to try a new plan. Thomas has discovered a way to assault the city from the rear; a rotted wooden palisade is all that prevents the army's entry. The earl gives Thomas permission to lead an assault, with Jekyll in nominal command. Things do not go according to plan, but Thomas and his men get into the city, open the gates, and the murdering, pillaging and raping begin. In his search for loot, Jekyll encounters Jeanette and attempts to rape her, but is prevented by the earl, who walks in on him with his pants down.

The earl has no choice but to give Jekyll the spoils of war, but he places Jeanette and her young son under royal protection. The earl leaves Skeat and his men, including Thomas, to garrison the captured city. Thomas and his men guard Jeanette from Sir Simon, but Jeanette will not let them in her house. As a reward for the capture of the city, Skeat and his men are allowed to pillage the countryside, enriching themselves. A French force based in Lannion under the command of Sir Geoffrey de Pont Blanc presents the only real threat, but neither side wishes to fight on the other's terms. Jekyll, however, is eager for plunder, so he and his men battle Sir Geoffrey's force. Jekyll loses the battle, but Skeat sets a trap, having some of his men pretend to flee in panic; Geoffrey is deceived and his force is mowed down by English longbows. Skeat lets Geoffrey go free, much to Jekyll's fury (due to the lost opportunity for a ransom). Thomas' response is to tell Jekyll to "go and boil your arse".

Later that night, Thomas is ambushed by Jekyll's men, brutally beaten and about to have his own arse put into a cauldron of boiling water, but is saved by Father Hobbe, a friend who constantly reminds him of his vow of revenge. Thomas and Jeanette devise a plan to take revenge on Jekyll. Skeat and his men then attack Lannion, weakened by the loss of Geoffrey's force. During the attack, Geoffrey is killed by Thomas. A French relief force is destroyed by Skeat's archers. That night, Thomas and Jeanette lure Jekyll into an ambush out of the town. He attempts to rape Jeanette again. Thomas kills Jekyll's squire and injures Jekyll, but Jekyll escapes.

Normandy
Thomas is guilty of murder, and Jekyll tortures Jeanette's servants until one confirms that she was the mastermind, so they decide to seek refuge with the Duke of Brittany, to whom Jeanette is related through her husband. The Duke, however, rapes Jeanette and kidnaps her son, but Jeanette escapes with Thomas. She is traumatised by the event, but Thomas nurses her back to health. The two then rejoin the main English army under Edward III that has invaded the channel. Jeanette becomes attached to the Black Prince as a Lady of Honour. Thomas takes part in the assault on the French city of Caen. During the battle he recognises the coat of arms of Sir Guillaume d'Evecque, and shoots him in the thigh. He also rescues a young woman named Eleanor from being raped by an English man-at-arms. As he leaves the house, Jekyll sees him and knocks him unconscious, afterwards leaving him to hang.

Thomas is rescued by Eleanor, who is revealed to be Sir Guillaume's illegitimate child. Sir Guillaume appears to Thomas with a missing eye, along with the wound Thomas gave him. Sir Guillaume tells Thomas that it was the Harlequin who gave him the wound. Sir Guillaume, like Thomas, wants to kill the Harlequin, and the two become friends. Thomas is nursed back to health by a Jewish doctor named Mordecai. Meanwhile, Jeanette confronts Jekyll in front of the Prince, who has Jekyll banished from the army. Thomas learns a great deal about his family from Sir Guillaume and a churchman in Caen. His father was a member of the infamous Vexille family- the former counts of Astarac and descendants of the Cathar heretics. Thomas also learns that the Vexille family may be in possession of the Holy Grail, and the Harlequin had gone to Hookton to find it as well as the Lance of St. George. Despite this new information Thomas decides to return to the English army with Eleanor who becomes his lover and simply be an archer for the time being. Before the fight, the king of England comes to unite the army to strengthen the dark mood they are in. Skeat is knighted by the king.

Meanwhile, Sir Simon Jekyll decides to join the French army for a chance to take revenge on both Jeanette and the Black Prince. He impresses several knights through his battle skills, and even manages to defeat a black knight- the Harlequin, who reveals himself to be Guy Vexille, the Count of Astarac, and Thomas' cousin.

Crécy
Thomas manages to rejoin Will Skeat's band and helps the English defeat a French force guarding a river ford in the battle of Blanchetaque. The two armies then line up for battle at Crécy. Sir Guillaume, Sir Simon, and Guy Vexille are all on the French side. During the epic battle the French are massacred by the English arrows, but the fighting soon becomes hand to hand. Jekyll encounters Thomas on the battlefield and attempts to kill him, but Sir Guillaume stabs Jekyll in the side and kills him, as Jekyll is in Vexille livery.  Sir Guillaume then encounters Vexille and tries to kill him, as do Thomas and Skeat. Vexille severely wounds Skeat in the head, and Sir Guillaume is nearly killed by the English, though Thomas rescues him. Guy manages to escape, though not before he recognises Thomas.

Skeat is sent to Mordecai to recover and Sir Guillaume is set free to help him.

Characters in Harlequin 
 Thomas of Hookton - protagonist, illegitimate son of a priest, archer in the English army
 Will Skeat - Thomas's friend and commander, a captain in the service of the Earl of Northampton
 William de Bohun, 1st Earl of Northampton - English nobleman and military commander
 Guy Vexille, Comte d'Astarac - Thomas's cousin, his father's murderer and the antagonist, the Harlequin
 Sir Guillaume d'Evecque - French knight
 Edward of Woodstock, Prince of Wales - heir to the English throne
 King Edward III of England - King of England and father of Edward of Woodstock
 Sir Simon Jekyll - Thomas's sworn enemy, a poor English knight
 Jeanette - daughter of a rich Breton merchant, widow of the Count of Armorica
 Charles of Blois, Duke of Brittany - Kidnapper of Jeanette's son
 Eleanor - Sir Guillaume's illegitimate daughter
 King Philip VI of France - King of France
 Ralph Vexille - Thomas's father and Guy's uncle, the priest in Hookton and a former madman

References 
  
  
 

2000 British novels
Thomas of Hookton novels
Fiction set in the 1340s
Novels set in the 14th century
Edward III of England
Edward the Black Prince
Books with cover art by Paul Bacon
HarperCollins books